Samuel Robinson Jackson (15 July 1859 – 19 July 1941) was an English first-class cricketer, who played one game for Yorkshire County Cricket Club in 1891. A right-handed batsman, he scored 9 and a duck in the Roses Match at Old Trafford, which Lancashire won by an innings and 49 runs.  He fared better in a non first-class match against Leicestershire at Headingley in the same year, scoring an unbeaten 54 out of Yorkshire's first innings of 156 and 15 in the second innings.  Leicestershire won by one wicket. Reputed to be a right arm fast bowler, Jackson did not bowl in either of these games.

Born in Ecclesall, Sheffield, Yorkshire, England, Jackson died in July 1941 in Leeds, Yorkshire.

References

External links
Cricinfo Profile

1859 births
1941 deaths
Yorkshire cricketers
Cricketers from Sheffield
English cricketers
English cricketers of 1890 to 1918